Th Australian Wool Reserve Price Scheme (RPS) was a price floor scheme for wool that operated in Australia between 1970 and 2001. The scheme was set up by the Australian Wool Commission, created in November 1970, which was succeeded in January 1973 by the Australian Wool Corporation (AWC). The scheme was set up to smooth out fluctuations in prices for wool, of which Australia continues to be a major producer. The objective was for the AWC to buy wool when its price was below the floor price, which after 1987 was set by the Wool Council of Australia, and then sell it later when the market recovered. The scheme was funded by a levy on wool sold by growers. The Wool Council of Australia was established in 1979, and was the peak national body representing Australia's woolgrowers on wool industry issues and was responsible for the development and implementation of woolgrower policy. In July 2001, it was replaced by WoolProducers Australia.

The scheme worked well until the mid-1980s, but eventually over-confidence set in, and the reserve level was raised too much. In 1987, the relevant Minister was removed from the reserve price setting process, and the floor price came to be set by the Wool Council, which set the floor price at a high 830 cents a kilogram. This encouraged wool producers to vastly increase production. Shortly after that decision the market collapsed. For various reasons, both the Chinese and the Russian mills all but stopped buying wool. The AWC kept buying the wool coming onto the auctions in Australia at the floor price. Before long, the AWC had exhausted its billion dollar plus reserves and started borrowing. Warehouses all over Australia were bursting with a massive and unsalable wool stockpile. But the AWC and the Council resolutely refused to consider any reduction in the floor price.

In February 1991 the reserve price scheme was suspended. The AWC wool stockpile was at 4.7 million bales (approaching a billion kilograms), and it was incurring around $3 million per day (over $1 billion per year) in storage costs and interest. 

A key cause of the collapse of the scheme has been attributed to a change in the scheme's governance arrangements, whereby the Wool Council came to set the floor price, which led to increased political pressures to raise the guaranteed minimum floor price in 1974 to unsustainable levels. The minimum floor price gave artificial confidence to wool mills which saw little to no price risk and began purchasing forward and increasing stockpiles. At the same time farmers bred more sheep and produced more wool. The floor price had increased by 70% by 1991 and the AWC had built up a stockpile that would crash the industry.

The responsible Labor Minister, John Kerin, initially refused to take direct action, but tried to get wool industry's leaders to see reason. When Kerin did act, the reserve price was initially cut to 700 cents a kilogram. There were still no buyers. 

When free market auctions resumed, wool sold for 430 cents a kilogram. In October 1998, wool prices hit a record low of 465 cents per kilogram.

The Australian Wool Realisation Commission (AWRC) was formed in 1991 to take control of the wool stockpile from AWC, and to liquidate it. It took AWRC to 2001 before it was able to sell the last of the stockpile, and AWRC was dissolved in 2002. The sale process depressed the market price to some extent, while the stockpile was itself sold significantly below its cost price. With the collapse of the reserve price scheme, farmers and wool related businesses all went broke. Key processors in England, Germany, France, Italy and Eastern Europe went out of business. China would invest heavily in new textile technology, factories and machinery, and by 2018 would be buying 80% of Australia's wool clip.

References

Wool organizations
Australian sheep industry
Wool
Wool
Wool
Agricultural organisations based in Australia